Sasquatch is an American true crime documentary television series that premiered on Hulu on April 20, 2021, with a South by Southwest pre-release screen on March 16, 2021. The show begins with investigative journalist David Holthouse's recalling a story he heard in 1993 on a cannabis farm in Mendocino County, part of the Emerald Triangle in Northern California. Holthouse heard someone say that bigfoot has killed three people on a nearby cannabis farm. 
Throughout the show Holthouse talks with marijuana growers and law enforcement in Mendocino County, who tell him about possible connections to the Hells Angels biker gang and Spy Rock Road, a lawless marijuana growing area of Mendocino County near Laytonville. These interviews reveal the larger problem of missing persons in the Emerald Triangle.

Cast 
 David Holthouse - Self - Investigative Journalist
 Ghostdance - Self - Cannabis Farmer
 Christopher Dienstag - Self - Former Cannabis Farmer
 Razor - Self - Cannabis Farmer
 Molly Sinoway - Self - Back to the Lander
 Bob Gimlin - Self - Legendary Sasquatch Hunter
 Charles Carlson - Self - Back to the Lander
 Larry Livermore - Self - Back to the Lander
 Diana - Self - Niece of Hugo Olea-Lopez
 Goerges and Wayne - Themselves - Life Partners/Sasquatch Hunters
 Bob Heironimus - Self - Self-Proclaimed Sasquatch Hoaxer
 Brian Regal - Self - Author of Searching for Sasquatch
 Luis Espinoza - Self - Lead Investigator, Hugo Olea-Lopez Case
 Dale Ferranto - Self - CAMP Commander
 Tom Allman - Self - Mendocino County Sheriff
 James Fay - Self - Sasquatch Hunter
 Jerry Hein - Self - Sasquatch Hunter
 Mike Sinoway - Self - Attorney
 Mark Saiz - Self - CAMP Officer
 Jim Murphy - Self - Retired Police Officer
 Jeffrey Meldrum - Self - Professor of Anatomy and Anthropology

Episodes

Reception 
Sasquatch has received mostly positive reviews with critics praising the pacing, animated recreations, and true sense of danger. Richard Roeper of the Chicago Sun-Times wrote, "director Joshua Rofe makes great use of sparse, graphic-novel type re-enactment animation to augment the usual assortment of interviews and archival footage." One of the few negative reviews came from Eileen Jones of Jacobin, who wrote that it consisted of "entirely unserious, exploitative hijinks" which contrasted with the serious subject matter.

See also 
 Spyrock, California
 Murder Mountain (TV series)
 Emerald Triangle
 Sequoia County, California

References

External links 
  on Hulu
 

2020s American documentary television series
Hulu original programming
English-language television shows
True crime television series
2021 American television series debuts
Cannabis in California
Works about cannabis trafficking
Television series about illegal drug trade
Television about Bigfoot